is a Saudi Arabian–Japanese animated series co-produced by Manga Productions and Toei Animation.

Plot
The first season is set in Riyadh in the year 2050, revolving around an old woman named Asmaa who narrates folktales from the Arabian Peninsula to her three grandchildren. The second season will be set in Neom.

Production
Future's Folktales was a co-production between two animation firms, Manga Productions of Saudi Arabia and Toei Animation of Japan. In 2021, Manga and Toei entered a partnership with the developer of the planned community Neom, which was made the setting of the second season.

Broadcast and distribution
Future's Folktales was first broadcast in January 2020 and was made available to various television broadcasters in Japan, mainland China, Taiwan, Ireland, the United Kingdom and the United States. Sentai Filmworks holds the rights to broadcast the series in North America, while the series premiered in Japan on J Tele on 4 April 2020.

References

2020 anime television series debuts
Anime with original screenplays
Saudi Arabian animated series
Japanese animated television series
Sentai Filmworks
Television series set in the 2050s
Toei Animation television